William Tilden Blodgett (18 February 1824 – 4 November 1875) was a New York City art collector who was instrumental in founding the Metropolitan Museum of Art.

He was active in the American Civil War and organized the NYC Union League Club and the Sanitary Fair to raise funds for the wounded. He founded the newspaper The Nation and was a leader in establishing the American Museum of Natural History. He was a founding member of the committee to form the Met in 1869 and was its first chairman. He had been on the selection committee for the American works to be presented at the French exhibition of 1867 and thus felt he knew enough to purchase pictures for the young museum while abroad in 1870.

He purchased a total of 174 pictures which he financed together with John Taylor Johnston and about half of this "1871 purchase" is still in the museum.

These pictures are:

References

External links

American art collectors
People associated with the Metropolitan Museum of Art
1823 births
1875 deaths
Businesspeople from New York City
19th-century American businesspeople